People with disability in Liberia face many challenges. The cultural attitude towards disability in Liberia is largely negative. Often, it is seen as the result of witchcraft or as punishment for a person's behavior. However, the government and non-governmental organizations (NGO) are working towards a more inclusive country for people with disabilities.

Demographics 
Statistics from 2008 show that around 14 percent of the population of Liberia has a disability.

Causes 
The Second Liberian Civil War caused various types of disability to as many as 800,000 people. Many people in Liberia have congenital conditions, but others become disabled due to birth trauma.

Policy 
The government of Liberia has stated that it has a commitment to providing an inclusive society for people with disabilities. In 2005, Liberia created the National Commission On Disabilities Liberia. Liberia signed and ratified the Convention on the Rights of Persons with Disabilities in 2012.

Liberia has various protections for people with disabilities in the workforce. The government also promotes tax incentives for hiring people with disabilities and has a target of 4% employment for people with disabilities.

People with disabilities have received less attention than other groups of people who are at risk in the country.

Non-governmental organizations 
Non-governmental organizations (NGO) in the country have called on the government to secure the rights of people with disabilities. Many of these groups have adopted a National Action Plan for the Inclusion of Persons with Disabilities. NGOs advocating for people with disabilities became more involved in the process of advocacy following the 2005 elections in Liberia.

Humanity & Inclusion has been working in Liberia since 2000. The National Union of the Disabled (NUOD) was established in 2009 to advocate for people with disabilities in Liberia. Other prominent NGOs in Liberia include the Disabled Females International-Liberia (ADFI), Organisation for the Social Integration of the Liberian Deaf (OSILD), Liberia National Association of the Blind (LNAB) and the Christian Association of the Blind-Liberia (CAB).

Education 
New residential schools for the blind are being constructed in Montserrado County.

Accessibility 
There is a lack of physical accessibility in Liberia. Many government buildings do not have ramps and there are not enough sidewalks in cities.

Cultural attitudes 
People with disabilities in Liberia often face discrimination and marginalization. There is a tradition of believing that a family has been subject to witchcraft when a child with disabilities is born and the family may be shunned and the child subject to cruel treatment. 

Disabilities that were caused by war are also stigmatized. These can be mental disabilities, such as posttraumatic stress disorder (PTSD) or physical disabilities, such as amputations.

Sport 

Many of the members of the Liberian amputee football team were once former child soldiers. Liberia participated in the first All African Amputee Football Tournament in 2007 which was sponsored by FIFA and held in Sierra Leone. After the tournament, Liberia along with Ghana and Sierra Leone formed the African Nations Amputee Football Federation (AFFA).

See Also 
The National Commission On Disabilities

References

Sources 

 
 

 
Liberian culture
Disability in Africa